"Telecommunication" is a song by A Flock of Seagulls from their debut album A Flock of Seagulls, released in 1982. The song was released in 1981 as the band's second single. Although it did not chart on either the traditional United Kingdom or United States charts, it received considerable time on the dance charts. It peaked at number 19 on the Hot Dance Club Play chart in 1981, along with "Modern Love Is Automatic". The uptempo beat featuring power chords and heavy synth, along with the futuristic lyrics, has enabled the song to reach cult status. The song is noteworthy because the band eschewed the guitar-laden choruses many songs of this period had (e.g. power ballad), and instead relied on percussion arpeggios and multi-layered sounds. The effect is not unlike what is known as the Wall of Sound effect, although unlike recordings of Phil Spector (who expressed interest in the band, calling them "phenomenal"), A Flock of Seagulls recorded in stereo.

Formats and track listing

7": Jive. / Jive 4 United Kingdom
"Telecommunication" – 2:31
"Intro" – 3:23

12": Jive. / Jive T 4 United Kingdom
"Telecommunication" – 2:31
"Intro" – 3:23
"Tanglimara" – 4:33

Lyrics
The song details types of energy transmitted across time and space. The first line mentions "ultraviolet..radio light..to your solar system..." indicating someone or something is attempting to communicate across the galaxy. In astronomy, UV light is emitted by very hot objects. A motif in the band's lyrics is alien life forms (with their debut album being essentially a rock opera about alien abduction) and futuristic technology. The song also includes references to nuclear energy and wireless communication.

See also
Alien abduction
Concept album
New wave music
Phil Spector
Wall of Sound

References

External links
A Flock of Seagulls reviewed in 1982

1981 singles
1981 songs
A Flock of Seagulls songs
Jive Records singles